Admiral Sir Wilfrid Rupert Patterson  (20 November 1893 – 15 December 1954) was a senior officer in the Royal Navy. He was the Commodore Commanding His Majesty's Australian Squadron from September to November 1939. He participated in the naval battle that sunk the German battleship Bismarck.

Naval career
Born on 20 November 1893 in Belfast, Ireland, the son of William Robert Patterson and Elizabeth Fleming. He joined the Royal Navy as a cadet on 15 September 1906 and specialised in gunnery. He was appointed the Commodore Commanding His Majesty's Australian Squadron between 2 September 1939 and 1 November 1939.

In recognition of the role played while commanding  in the destruction of the Bismarck, he was made a Companion of the Order of the Bath on 14 October 1941. He was made a Commander of the Order of the British Empire on 11 June 1946.

He was present at the surrender of the Japanese.

Notes

1893 births
1954 deaths
Knights Commander of the Order of the Bath
Commanders of the Order of the British Empire
Commanders of the Royal Victorian Order
Royal Navy admirals
Military personnel from Belfast
Royal Navy officers of World War II
Lords of the Admiralty
Foreign recipients of the Legion of Merit
Admiralty personnel of World War II